Mitch Bevan (born 20 February 1991) in Brisbane) is an Australian footballer who plays for Far North Queensland FC in the National Premier Leagues Queensland.

Club career
He was signed to Gold Coast United's inaugural National Youth League after having played in Brisbane Roar's National Youth League squad the previous season.

On 7 November 2009 he made his senior debut for United as an 89th-minute substitute in 1–0 win against Sydney FC.

Bevan now plays in Cairns for the Far North Queensland FC Heat.

Honours
With Gold Coast United FC:
 National Youth League Championship: 2009–2010

References

External links
 Gold Coast United profile

1991 births
Living people
Gold Coast United FC players
Cairns FC players
A-League Men players
Australian soccer players
National Premier Leagues players
Association football wingers